LESLi (short for Labor and Employment Standards Library) is an Internet resource that helps academics, sourcing, legal, and investment professionals gain access to continually updated information on labor, wage, and health and safety laws applicable to social compliance assessments. 

LESLi was launched by STR Responsible Sourcing in February 2010, 
it contains a searchable collection of relevant legal text excerpts for over 140 countries, translated into English from their foreign-language originals.

References

External links 
 LESLi official website
 STR official website

American legal websites
Internet properties established in 2010